David Richards may refer to:

Sports
 David Richards (American football) (born 1966), NFL offensive lineman
 David Richards (cricket administrator), former CEO of the ICC
 David Richards (cricketer) (born 1931), English cricketer
 David Richards (footballer, born 1896) (1896–1971), English football player
 David Richards (motorsport) (born 1952), Welsh chairman of Prodrive and Aston Martin
 David Richards (rugby union, born 1954), Wales and British Lions international
 David Richards (rugby union, born 1999), Welsh rugby union player
 David Richards (footballer, born 1910), Welsh footballer
 Dave Richards (born 1943), English chairman of the FA Premier League
 Dave Richards (footballer, born 1993), Welsh football goalkeeper
 Davey Richards (born 1983), American wrestler

Others
 David Richards, Baron Richards of Herstmonceux (born 1952), former British Chief of the Defence Staff
 David Richards (Dafydd Ionawr) (1751–1827), Welsh-language poet
 David Richards (judge) (born 1951), British judge
 David Richards (record producer) (1956–2013), producer of records by Queen and David Bowie
 David Richards (sculptor) (1829–1897), Welsh sculptor who moved to the United States; known for work at Black Hawk Museum and Lodge
 David Richards (writer), theater critic for The Washington Post, novelist
 David Adams Richards (born 1950), Canadian writer and Senator
 David E. Richards, late Episcopal Suffragan bishop for the Episcopal Diocese of Albany, New York
 David James Richards (born 1970), British entrepreneur, co-founder of WANdisco
 David L. Richards (born 1968), American social scientist, co-director of the CIRI Human Rights Data Project
 David A. J. Richards (born 1944), American constitutional lawyer and moral philosopher,